New York v. Connecticut, 4 U.S. (4 Dall.) 1 (1799), was a lawsuit heard by the Supreme Court of the United States between the State of New York against the State of Connecticut in 1799 that arose from a land dispute between private parties. The case was the first case in which the Supreme Court exercised its original jurisdiction under Article III of the United States Constitution to hear controversies between two states.

Background
The Connecticut Gore region was a strip of land on New York's western border with Pennsylvania.  Connecticut claimed jurisdiction over the land and granted it to Jeremiah Halsey and Andrew Ward in exchange for their construction of the state house in Hartford. (The building is now known as the Old State House.)

After New York granted certain parcels within the Connecticut Gore to other individuals, the successors in title to Halsey and Ward filed an action for ejectment in the United States Circuit Court for the District of Connecticut.  The defendants argued that they were residents of New York and that the land was actually in Steuben County, New York and so only state or federal courts in New York could exercise jurisdiction over the action. The plaintiffs claimed that the lands were actually in Connecticut.

The Supreme Court denied a motion to remove the cases from the Circuit Court, and New York subsequently filed a bill in equity against Connecticut and the Connecticut plaintiffs for an injunction to stay the ejectment proceedings.  As part of the bill, New York submitted an agreement between the states, dated November 28, 1683, that purported to recognize New York's rights to the land.

Because the bill in equity was filed while the Connecticut General Assembly was out of session, the state never actually participated in the case.  However, attorneys for the private land claimants argued that reasonable notice was not given for the injunction to be granted and that New York also lacked an interest in the proceedings to merit a stay.

Decision
The Court found that notice was sufficient since a shorter period of time may be reasonable when the application for injunction is made to a court, rather than a single judge. However, the Court denied the injunction and found that New York lacked standing. It had not been a party to the suits in the lower court and had no concrete interest in the decisions. Also, it was claiming jurisdiction over the land, not title to it. The Circuit Court lacked the power to determine either its boundaries or its consequent rights.

See also
List of United States Supreme Court cases, volume 4

Notes

References
Full text of the Court's decision at Wikisource

Further reading
The Connecticut Gore Title, Stated and Considered, Showing The Right of the Proprietors, to the Lands Lately Purchased by Them, from the State of Connecticut: Lying West of the Delaware River.  Hudson & Goodwin (Hartford, 1799).  An advocacy for Connecticut's right to the land, which contains the text of eighteen original documents pertaining to the land dispute dating back to 1631.
The Rise, programs, and effect of the claim of the proprietors of the Connecticut Gore, stated and considered.  Hudson & Goodwin (Hartford, 1802).

External links
 

United States Supreme Court cases
Internal territorial disputes of the United States
United States Supreme Court original jurisdiction cases
Legal history of New York (state)
Legal history of Connecticut
1799 in United States case law
1799 in Connecticut
1799 in New York (state)
United States Supreme Court cases of the Ellsworth Court